Dundalk was a parliamentary borough constituency in Ireland, which returned one Member of Parliament (MP) to the House of Commons of the Parliament of the United Kingdom. It was an original constituency represented in Parliament when the Union of Great Britain and Ireland took effect on 1 January 1801, replacing the Dundalk constituency in the Parliament of Ireland.

Boundaries
This constituency was the Parliamentary borough of Dundalk in County Louth.

History
The constituency was one of the two member borough constituencies in the Parliament of Ireland, which became a single member United Kingdom constituency when the union of Great Britain and Ireland took effect on 1 January 1801.

The first member of the United Kingdom House of Commons was to be selected from the area's two MPs in the Irish Parliament, by drawing lots. However both members resigned so the seat could not be filled by co-option and a by-election was necessary. The by-election took place on 28 February 1801. The Right Honourable Isaac Corry, a quite prominent political figure, was elected the first United Kingdom MP for Dundalk.

Corry was associated with what came to be called the Tory Party after the death of William Pitt the younger in 1806. Up until the extension of the franchise in 1832, the borough was strongly Tory in representation. The fact that no Tory or Conservative was elected after 1832 may say something about the unrepresentative nature of the old franchise.

Dundalk had a population of 9,256 in 1821. Walker records that the electorate in 1831 numbered 36. The population in 1831 had increased to 10,750. All the elections in the borough between 1801 and 1831 were unopposed returns.

The 1832 general election was conducted on a new franchise. The registered electorate, under the new system, numbered 318. At the borough's first contested election of the century 295 people voted (Liberal 167, Conservative 128).

From 1832 to 1885 the constituency returned members who were Liberals or who belonged to a series of Irish-based groups (the Repeal Association, the Independent Irish Party and the Home Rule League). The Liberals elected in Dundalk tended to have nationalist leanings.

The last MP for the constituency was the prominent Liberal lawyer-politician, Charles Russell. An Irish born Catholic, Russell was to be the lead Counsel for Charles Stewart Parnell during the inquiry into allegations which had appeared in The Times. In March 1887 it had been suggested that Parnell was complicit in the murders of the Chief Secretary for Ireland Lord Frederick Cavendish and the Permanent Under-Secretary for Ireland, T.H. Burke. Letters were produced to support the allegations. As a result of Russell's masterly cross-examination of Richard Pigott, the forger of the letters, the Commission of Enquiry vindicated Parnell.

Members of Parliament

Elections

Elections in the 1830s

Elections in the 1840s

Redington resigned after being appointed Under-Secretary for Ireland, causing a by-election.

Upon petition, MacTavish was unseated and McCullagh was declared elected on 20 March 1848

Elections in the 1850s

Elections in the 1860s

Elections in the 1870s

Elections in the 1880s

Notes

References
The Parliaments of England by Henry Stooks Smith (1st edition published in three volumes 1844–50), 2nd edition edited (in one volume) by F.W.S. Craig (Political Reference Publications 1973)

Westminster constituencies in County Louth (historic)
Constituencies of the Parliament of the United Kingdom established in 1801
Constituencies of the Parliament of the United Kingdom disestablished in 1885
Dundalk